This is a list of flag bearers who have represented Central African Republic at the Olympics.

Flag bearers carry the national flag of their country at the opening ceremony of the Olympic Games.

See also
Central African Republic at the Olympics

References

Flag bearers
Central African Republic
Olympic flagbearers